Thomas Pringle McDonald QC (18 August 1901 – 23 July 1969), was a Scottish lawyer and Liberal Party politician. He was Sheriff of Aberdeen, Kincardine and Banff.

Background
McDonald was born the son of James McDonald. He was educated at George Watson's College and Edinburgh University. In 1930 he married Harriet Selby McDowall. They had one son and two daughters.

Professional career
McDonald was a member of the Scottish bar and became a Scottish King's council in 1948. He was Sheriff of Aberdeen, Kincardine and Banff  from 1954-1969.

Political career
McDonald was first active in politics at Edinburgh University where he was President of the Student's Representative Council and President of the University's Liberal Association. He was Liberal candidate for the Edinburgh East division at the 1929 General Election. Edinburgh East had been a Liberal seat until it was lost to Labour in 1924. In that bad election for the party, his predecessor finished third. McDonald was able to overtake the Unionist candidate but unable to defeat the sitting Labour MP. He did not stand for Parliament again.

Electoral record

References

1901 births
1969 deaths
People educated at George Watson's College
Alumni of the University of Edinburgh
Scottish sheriffs
Liberal Party (UK) parliamentary candidates